, also referred to as  in the Canon Of Judo, is one of the official 29 grappling techniques of Kodokan Judo. It is one of the nine joint techniques of the Kansetsu-waza list, one of the three grappling lists in Judo's Katame-waza, enumerating 29 grappling techniques, and is also demonstrated by Kyuzo Mifune in the video The Essence of Judo.

Technique description 
Sankaku is translated as "triangle," Ude-Hishigi as arm break, with gatame roughly translated as control. The triangle is formed by the legs of Tori that cross behind the head of Uke. The form created by the crossed legs resembles a triangle, hence the name. Sankaku-waza is a term that includes several control techniques (levers, chokes and fixed assets) that are characterized by this particular method of maintaining control with the legs.

Escapes

Kesa-gata-sankaku-gatame-ude-hishigi 
Scarf hold triangle armlock defense method

Included Systems 
Systems:
Kodokan Judo, List of Kodokan Judo techniques
Lists:
The Canon Of Judo
Judo technique
The video, The Essence of Judo featuring Kyuzo Mifune
Ude gatame ude kujiki (3rd pattern)(腕固腕挫 その三)
Sankaku-Gatame-Ude-Kujiki (1st pattern, 2nd pattern)(三角固腕挫 その一、三角固腕挫 その二)

Similar Techniques, Variants, and Aliases 
Variants
Ao-Muke-Gata-Ude-Hishigi
Ao-Muke-Gata-Ude-Hishigi is described in the Canon Of Judo.
 Omote sankaku gatame (表三角固)
 Yoko sankaku gatame (横三角固)
 Ushiro sankaku gatame (後三角固)
 Shime garami (絞緘)

IJF Official Names:
Ude-hishigi-sankaku-gatame(腕挫三角固)
U.H. Sankaku gatame
Sankaku gatame(三角固)
SGT

Aliases
Three corner armlock

References

External links 
 Information on the Techniques of Judo.

Judo technique